Sur-e Meqdad (also Romanized as Sūr-e Meqdād and Sūr-e Moqdād; also known as Sūd Moghdād, Sūr-e Meghdād, and Var-e Meqdād) is a village in Asiab Rural District, in the Central District of Omidiyeh County, Khuzestan Province, Iran. At the 2006 census, its population was 206, in 34 families.

References 

Populated places in Omidiyeh County